Philodromus blanckei is a spider species found in Corsica, Sardinia and Italy.

See also 
 List of Philodromidae species

References

External links 

blanckei
Spiders of Europe
Spiders described in 1995